is a Japanese tennis player playing on the ATP Challenger Tour. He achieved a career-high ATP singles ranking of world No. 78 on 04 November 2019 and doubles ranking of No. 102 on 20 August 2018. He has won eight ITF Futures singles titles and reached the final of the Lexington Challenger in August 2015, losing to John Millman in three sets.

Career

Juniors
As a junior Uchiyama compiled a win–loss record of 99–61 (and 77–56 in doubles), reaching as high as No. 12 in the combined world rankings in March 2010. He reached the final of the 2009 Australian Open Boys' Doubles with Mikhail Biryukov, losing to Francis Casey Alcantara and Hsieh Cheng-peng in the final.

2013
Uchiyama made his Davis Cup debut for Japan in February 2013, in the Asia/Oceania Zone Group I first round against Indonesia in Tokyo. In the 2014 Davis Cup World Group first round against Canada in Tokyo, he played the doubles rubber with partner Kei Nishikori, winning over Canadian pair Daniel Nestor and Frank Dancevic. Japan defeated Canada 4-1 to advance to the quarterfinals in the World Group for the first time ever.

2019: Best season: Major debut at Wimbledon and Top 100 debut
He qualified on his seventh attempt at the 2019 Japan Open, his home tournament. As a result he reached the top 100 at world No. 87 on 21 October 2019.

Singles performance timeline

ATP career finals

Doubles: 1 (1 title)

Challenger and Futures/World Tennis finals

Singles: 26 (14-12)

Doubles: 11 (3 titles, 8 runners-up)

Junior Grand Slam finals

Doubles: 1 (1 runner-up)

References

External links
 
 
 
 Yasutaka Uchiyama at the Japan Tennis Association

1992 births
Living people
Japanese male tennis players
Tennis players at the 2014 Asian Games
Tennis players at the 2018 Asian Games
Tennis players at the 2010 Summer Youth Olympics
Asian Games medalists in tennis
Asian Games bronze medalists for Japan
Medalists at the 2014 Asian Games
20th-century Japanese people
21st-century Japanese people